Marathon Oil Corporation is an American company engaged in hydrocarbon exploration incorporated in Ohio and headquartered in the Marathon Oil Tower in Houston, Texas. A direct descendant of Standard Oil, it also runs international gas operations focused on Equatorial Guinea, offshore Central Africa.

The company is ranked 534th on the Fortune 500 and 1900th on the Forbes Global 2000.

As of December 31, 2020, the company had  of estimated proven reserves, of which 86% was in the United States and 14% was in Equatorial Guinea. The company's proved reserves consisted 52% of petroleum, 30% natural gas and 18% natural gas liquids.

History 
Marathon Oil began as "The Ohio Oil Company" in 1887. In 1889, the company was purchased by John D. Rockefeller's Standard Oil. It remained a part of Standard Oil until Standard Oil was broken up in 1911. In 1930, The Ohio Oil Company bought the Transcontinental Oil Company and established the "Marathon" brand name. In 1962, the company changed its name to "Marathon Oil Company".

In 1981, Mobil made a hostile takeover offer to buy the company. However, the board of Marathon Oil rejected the offer and instead sold the company to United States Steel. A legal battle ensued thereafter.

In 1990, the headquarters was moved to Houston, Texas, but the company's refining subsidiary maintained its headquarters in Findlay, Ohio.

In 1984, Marathon purchased the U.S. unit of Husky Energy for $505 million.

In 1998, Marathon and Ashland Global contributed their refining operations to Marathon Ashland Petroleum LLC, now Marathon Petroleum.

In 2001, USX, the holding company that owned United States Steel and Marathon, spun off the steel business and, in 2002, USX renamed itself Marathon Oil Corporation.

In 2003, Marathon sold its Canadian operations to Husky Energy.

In 2003, the company sold its interest in the Yates Oil Field to Kinder Morgan for $225 million.

In 2007, Marathon acquired Western Oil Sands for $6.6 billion and gained ownership of its 20% stake in the Athabasca oil sands in northern Alberta and other assets in the midwestern United States.

In 2011, Marathon completed the corporate spin-off of Marathon Petroleum, distributing a 100% interest to its shareholders.

In June 2013, Marathon sold its Angolan oil and gas field to Sinopec for $1.52 billion.

In September 2013, Marathon sold a 10% stake in an oil and gas field offshore Angola for $590 million to Sonangol Group.

In October 2014, the company sold its business in Norway to Det Norske Oljeselskap ASA for $2.1 billion.

In 2017, it sold its interests in the Athabasca oil sands for $2.5 billion and acquired assets in the Permian Basin for $1.2 billion.

In March 2018, it sold its assets in Libya for $450 million to Total SE.

In 2020, the company derived 13% of its revenues from sales to Marathon Petroleum and 12% of its revenues from sales to Koch Industries.

Corporate philanthropy
Since 2003, Marathon Oil and its partners Noble Energy and AMPCO, have invested in the Bioko Island Malaria Control Project (BIMCP) in Equatorial Guinea. The project includes distribution of insecticide nets, indoor residual spraying and larval source management, preventive therapy for pregnant women and malaria case management, and investment in a possible malaria vaccine. The project has resulted in a 63% reduction in malaria parasite prevalence and a 63% reduction in the mortality rate and 97% reduction in severe anemia in children under 5 years old.

Criticism

Environmental record
According to a 2017 study, the company was responsible for 0.19% of global industrial greenhouse gas emissions from 1988 to 2015.

Dealings in Equatorial Guinea
The company was investigated for payments made to Teodoro Obiang Nguema Mbasogo, the president of Equatorial Guinea. The SEC completed its investigation in 2009 and did not recommend any enforcement action in the matter.

See also

 Marathon Petroleum
 Standard Oil
 James C. Donnell
 List of oil exploration and production companies

References

External links
 

 
Companies based in Houston
Economy of the Western United States
Automotive companies of the United States
Chemical companies of the United States
Natural gas companies of the United States
Oil companies of the United States
Companies listed on the New York Stock Exchange
American companies established in 1887
1887 establishments in Texas
Energy companies established in 1887
Oil and gas companies of the United States